Luciano Marin (9 December 1931 – 12 November 2019)   was an Italian actor. He appeared in more than twenty films since 1957.

Filmography

References

External links 

1931 births
2019 deaths
Italian male film actors